is a Buddhist temple of the Shingon-shū Chizan-ha in Sasebo, Nagasaki, Japan.

According to the temple story, Ohashi Kannon-ji was founded in the early 8th century by Gyōki, who traveled around Japan to preach to commoners. 

The temple precincts are a natural stone bridge made by erosion of tertiary sandstone with two lines. It is one of the Hirado Hakkei (平戸八景) eight landscapes within the former territory of Hirado Domain.

External links
 Ohashi Kannon Temple - vOmbudsman

 

Buddhist temples in Nagasaki Prefecture
Shingon Buddhism
Buildings and structures in Nagasaki Prefecture
8th-century establishments in Japan